Unemployment Provision Convention, 1934 (shelved) is  an International Labour Organization Convention.

It was established in 1934, with the preamble stating:
Having decided upon the adoption of certain proposals with regard to unemployment insurance and various forms of relief for the unemployed,...

Modification
The concepts included in the convention were modified and subsequently included in Employment Promotion and Protection against Unemployment Convention, 1988.

Ratifications
Prior to it being shelved, the convention was ratified by 14 states.

External links 
Text.
Ratifications.

Unemployment
Shelved International Labour Organization conventions
Treaties concluded in 1934
Treaties entered into force in 1938